Tremataspis is a genus of an extinct osteostracan agnathan from the Silurian period of what is now Estonia.
 
Compared with its relatives, the shield was unusually elongated, covering the whole front of the body, and was more rounded in shape. It is thought that Tremataspis used its rounder shield to burrow in the ocean floor, searching for food. Because the shield consisted of one solid piece, it probably did not grow during the animal's life; presumably, the larvae lacked the shield, which only appeared later in life.

References

Osteostraci genera
Fauna of Estonia
Silurian fish of Europe